The 1999 North Hertfordshire District Council election was held on 6 May 1999, at the same time as other local elections across Britain. All 49 seats on North Hertfordshire District Council were up for election following changes to ward boundaries.

Labour lost control of the council to the Conservatives at the election, with the Conservative leader, F. John Smith, becoming leader of the council, taking the role from the Labour leader, David Kearns. The Liberal Democrat leader, Ian Simpson, lost his seat at the election and was replaced as group leader after the election by Steve Jarvis.

Ward Results
The results for each ward were as follows. An asterisk(*) indicates a sitting councillor standing for re-election.

References

1999 English local elections
1999